Bothrioneodermata is a clade of flatworms containing the Bothrioplanida and the Neodermata.

References

Platyhelminthes